The first election to Dinefwr Borough Council following the re-organization of local government in Wales was held in May 1973. It was followed by the 1976 election. On the same day there was UK Local elections to the other local authorities and community councils in Wales.

Results

Ammanford Town Ward 1 (one seat)

Ammanford Town Ward 2 (one seat)

Ammanford Town Ward 3 (one seat)

Ammanford Town Ward 4 (one seat)

Ammanford Town Ward 5 (one seat)

Betws (one seat)

Brynamman (one seat)

Cilycwm (one seat)

Cwmamman (three seats)

Cwmllynfell (one seat)

Cynwyl Gaeo and Llanwrda (one seat)

Glynamman (one seat)

Llandeilo Fawr North Ward (one seat)

Llandeilo Fawr South Ward (one seat)

Llandeilo Town (two seats)

Llanddeusant / Myddfai (one seat)

Llandovery Town (two seats)

Llandybie and Heolddu (three seats)

Llanegwad and Llanfynydd (one seat)

Llanfihangel Aberbythych and Llangathen (one seat)

Llangadog and Llansadwrn (one seat)

Llansawel and Talley (one seat)

Penygroes (two seats)

Saron (two seats)

References

1973
1973 Welsh local elections